The South African Congress of Democrats (SACOD) was a radical left-wing white, anti-apartheid organization founded in South Africa in 1952 or 1953 as part of the multi-racial Congress Alliance, after the African National Congress (ANC) invited whites to become part of the Congress Movement.

The establishment of the COD sought to illustrate opposition to apartheid among whites. The COD identified closely with the ANC and advocated racial equality and universal suffrage. Though small, COD was a key organization of the Congress Alliance. The COD took part in every Congress Alliance campaign until it was banned by the South African Apartheid government in September 1962.

Relationship with the ANC and SACP 
The ANC viewed the COD as a way to put its views directly to the white public. Moreover, as Nelson Mandela wrote, "The COD served an important symbolic function for Africans; blacks who had come into the struggle because they were anti-white discovered that there were indeed whites of goodwill who treated Africans as equal." Though COD was not itself a communist organization, many members of the banned South African Communist Party (SACP) joined the COD.

Members 
COD never had more than 700 members and was based mainly in Johannesburg and Cape Town. Members of COD included:  
 Michael Harmel
 Bram Fischer
 Joe Slovo
 Ruth First
 Denis Goldberg
 Albie Sachs
  Baruch Hirson
 Ben Turok 
 Harold Strachan
 Rusty Bernstein
 Hilda Bernstein
 Arthur Goldreich
 Helen Joseph
 Eve Hall
 Tony Hall

Sources

External links
"Obituary: Eve Hall"
"Obituary: Tony Hall"

Anti-Apartheid organisations
National liberation movements in Africa
Organisations associated with apartheid
Organizations formerly designated as terrorist
Defunct civic and political organisations in South Africa